The Island is a novel by Peter Benchley, published in 1979 by Doubleday & Co.

Plot summary
Blair Maynard, a divorced journalist in New York City, decides to write a story about the unexplained disappearance of yachts and other small boats in the Caribbean, hoping to debunk theories about the Bermuda Triangle. 

He has week-end custody of his preadolescent son Justin, and decides to mix a vacation with work, taking his son along. They fly from Miami to the Turks and Caicos island chain but, while on a fishing trip, are captured by a band of pirates. The pirates have, amazingly, remained undetected since the establishment of their pirate enclave by Jean-David Nau, the notorious buccaneer L'Olonnais, in 1671. The pirates have a constitution of sorts, called the Covenant, and have a cruel but workable society. They raise any children they capture to ensure the survival of the colony, but kill anyone over the age of thirteen years. In short order, Justin is brain-washed and groomed to lead the pirate band, much to Maynard's horror. Maynard tries repeatedly to escape, and finally attracts the attention of the passing United States Coast Guard cutter New Hope. The pirates attack and capture it, but Maynard is able to use a machine gun aboard to kill most of the pirates and to win Justin's and his own freedom.

Film adaptations
The Island (1980 film), a film directed by Michael Ritchie, was based upon the book; Benchley wrote the screenplay.  It starred Michael Caine and David Warner, opened to negative reviews and was considered a box office flop.

References

1979 American novels
American novels adapted into films
Bermuda Triangle in fiction
Novels about pirates
Novels by Peter Benchley
Novels about journalists
Novels set on islands
Doubleday (publisher) books